Elim Chan (born 18 November 1986) is a Hong Kong-born conductor. Elim Chan has been the chief conductor of the Antwerp Symphony Orchestra since the 2019-2020 concert season and has been the permanent guest conductor of the Royal Scottish National Orchestra since the 2018-2019 season.

Early life 
In 1986, Chan was born in Hong Kong.
As a youth, she played cello and piano and sang in choirs. Chan attended the Good Hope School (Form One).

Education 
Chan was a sixth-form student at Li Po Chun United World College in Hong Kong.

Chan began studies at Smith College in the US with the initial intent of becoming a medical doctor.  Following an initial experience in conducting during her second year of college, she changed her path of study and graduated with a Bachelor of Arts degree in music in 2009.

Chan moved to the University of Michigan, Ann Arbor for graduate studies in music. At Michigan, her teachers included Kenneth Kiesler.  She was music director of the University of Michigan Campus Symphony Orchestra, and of the Michigan Pops Orchestra (2012-2013). She earned her MM degree in orchestra conducting from Michigan in 2011, and her Doctor of Musical Arts in 2015.

Career 
In December 2014, at age 28, Chan won the Donatella Flick LSO Conducting Competition, the first female conductor to win the competition in its history. As part of winning the competition, she was subsequently named assistant conductor of the London Symphony Orchestra, for a one-year contract from 2015–2016.  She has also participated in master classes in conducting with Bernard Haitink.

In April 2016, NorrlandsOperan announced the appointment of Chan as its next chief conductor, effective in 2017, with an initial contract of 3 years.  In January 2017, she made her first guest-conducting appearance with the Royal Scottish National Orchestra (RSNO).  She returned as guest conductor with the RSNO a fortnight later as an emergency substitute for Neeme Järvi.  Based on these appearances, in June 2017, the RSNO appointed Chan as its next principal guest conductor, effective 2018.

In November 2017, Chan first guest-conducted the Antwerp Symphony Orchestra.  She returned as guest conductor in Antwerp in March 2018.  Based on these appearances, in May 2018, the orchestra announced the appointment of Chan as its next chief conductor, effective with the 2019–2020 season.  Chan is both the first female conductor, and the youngest conductor, ever to be named chief conductor of the orchestra.

Personal life 
Elim Chan is married to the Dutch percussionist Dominique Vleeshouwers, who was awarded the Dutch Music Prize (Nederlandse Muziekprijs) in 2020.

References

External links
 Harrison Parrott agency page on Elim Chan
 Hong Kong Philharmonic Orchestra biography of Elim Chan
 Davis United World College Scholars Program, page on Elim Chan
 Shadrach Kabango, Elim Chan on how conductors conjure musical magic.  Q, CBC Radio, 22 December 2014
 Yip's Children's Choral & Performing Arts Centre, Oliver Chou, 'Hong Kong conductor Elim Chan urges city to nurture musical talent'.  1 January 2015

1986 births
Living people
Hong Kong conductors (music)
Smith College alumni
University of Michigan School of Music, Theatre & Dance alumni
21st-century conductors (music)
21st-century Hong Kong musicians
21st-century women musicians
Women conductors (music)
People educated at a United World College